The Argentina women's national field hockey team is governed by the Argentine Hockey Confederation (CAH). The current coach is Fernando Ferrara, who was appointed after Carlos Retegui let go in late 2021. The team is currently second in the FIH Women's World Ranking.

Las Leonas (The Lionesses) have appeared in six Hockey World Cup finals, including the first final in 1974, which they lost 1–0 to the Netherlands. Argentina had to settle with second place in two more finals before winning the tournament for the first time in 2002, beating the Netherlands 4–3 in the final on penalty strokes after a 1–1 draw. Argentina, led by eight-time FIH Player of the Year Luciana Aymar won again in 2010, a 3–1 victory over the Netherlands. Argentina's World Cup-winning coaches are Sergio Vigil in 2002 and Carlos Retegui in 2010.

Argentina has been very successful at the Summer Olympics, winning four consecutive medals (two silver, two bronze) since the 2000 edition, when they became the first women's team in any sport to win an Olympic medal for their country. Luciana Aymar is the only player that has participated and won those four medals. Also, after their first title in 2001 at a Hockey Champions Trophy, they have won the tournament six more times. In front of a home crowd, they won the 2014–15 Hockey World League as the first international title after Aymar's retirement from the national team the previous year.

At a continental level, Argentina has dominated and won every tournament they played, including the Pan American Cup and the Pan American Games leaving the United States with second place on most events until they lost the 2011 Pan American Games final for the first time.

In July 2003, after the implementation of an official World Ranking System, Argentina reached the top of the FIH Women's World Ranking for the first time, reaching it again in 2010 after obtaining the World Cup title and once more in late 2013.

History
Hockey was introduced in Argentina by English immigrants at the beginning of the 20th century, and the first women's teams were officially formed in 1909. In 1997, Sergio Vigil, a former player for the men's national team, was appointed coach. Under his leadership, Las Leonas achieved their first World Hockey Cup title, their first Olympic medals, their first Champions Trophy medals, and many other achievements. The team went from having a rather limited audience to becoming a national sensation, with some of the players even appearing as models in advertising campaigns.

Nickname
Throughout its history, the team has developed a reputation for being tenacious even when a match appears to be lost. For this reason, a lioness was chosen as their symbol when the team qualified for the 2000 Summer Olympics. During the second round of games, Argentina played against the powerful Dutch team, and they chose this occasion to place the image of a lioness on their shirts for the first time.

The image was designed by then-player Inés Arrondo together with Vigil's sister-in-law. Argentina won that match, went on to win the silver medal, and Las Leonas were born. Subsequently, the junior (under 21) team is called Las Leoncitas ("the baby lionesses" or "the lioness cubs").

The lioness logo was redesigned in 2006 by the team kit supplier, Adidas, along with Confederación Argentina de Hockey and even some of the most representative players. This is slightly different from the original, showing the lioness' tail pretending to be a hockey stick while holding a ball.

The nickname also falls in line with an unwritten Argentine tradition of naming national teams after big cats: the men's field hockey team is called Los Leones ("The Lions"), the men's rugby union team is called Los Pumas ("The Pumas"), and the women's volleyball team is known as Las Panteras ("The Panthers").

Honours
Since its breakthrough in the 2000 Summer Olympics (where the team nicknamed "Las Leonas" for the first time), Argentina has won more than 20 official titles, which are detailed below:

 Summer Olympics:
  Silver medal: Sydney 2000, London 2012, Tokyo 2020
  Bronze medal: Athens 2004, Beijing 2008
  World Cup: 2002, 2010
  FIH Pro League: 2021–22
  FIH Hockey World League: 2014–15
  Champions Trophy: 2001, 2008, 2009, 2010, 2012, 2014, 2016
  Pan American Cup: 2001, 2004, 2009, 2013, 2017, 2022
  Pan American Games: 1987, 1991, 1995, 1999, 2003, 2007, 2019
  South American Championship: 2003, 2008, 2010, 2013
  South American Games': 2006, 2014, 2018

Tournament records

Players

Current squad
The following players were called to compete against Australia and United States in the Pro League between February 28th and March 5th in Hobart, Australia.

Players, caps and goals updated as of 5 March 2023.

Head coach: Fernando Ferrara

Recent call-ups
These players were called up in the last 12 months.

Past players

 Gabriela Aguirre
 Magdalena Aicega
 Laura Aladro
 Mariela Antoniska
 Inés Arrondo
 Luciana Aymar
 Noel Barrionuevo
 Moira Brinnand
 Claudia Burkart
 Victoria Carbó
 Julieta Castellán
 Martina Cavallero
 Laura del Colle
 María Colombo
 Silvia Corvalán
 Silvina D'Elía
 Marina di Giacomo
 Natalí Doreski
 Carla Dupuy
 María Paz Ferrari
 Andrea Fioroni
 Julieta Franco
 Anabel Gambero
 Soledad García
 Julia Gomes Fantasia
 Mariana González Oliva
 Victoria Granatto
 Alejandra Gulla
 Agustina Habif
 Florencia Habif
 María de la Paz Hernández
 Marcela Hussey
 Priscila Jardel
 Giselle Juárez
 Giselle Kañevsky
 Gabriela Liz
 Marisa López
 Rosario Luchetti
 Sofía Maccari
 Sofía MacKenzie
 Laura Maiztegui
 Mercedes Margalot
 Karina Masotta
 Delfina Merino
 Laura Mulhall
 Florencia Mutio
 Vanina Oneto
 Alejandra Palma
 Gabriela Pando
 María Gabriela Pazos
 Carla Rebecchi
 Marcela Richezza
 Jorgelina Rimoldi
 Micaela Retegui
 Macarena Rodríguez
 Cecilia Rognoni
 Pilar Romang
 Mariana Rossi
 Mariné Russo
 Gabriela Sánchez
 Mariela Scarone
 Daniela Sruoga
 Josefina Sruoga
 Ayelén Stepnik
 Belén Succi
 María Alejandra Tucat
 Paola Vukojicic
 Victoria Zuloaga

Not in use jersey numbers

When Luciana Aymar (eight-time FIH Player of the Year Award winner and regarded as the best player in the history of the sport), retired from the national team in 2014 after 376 international matches played, some of Aymar's teammates (such as Carla Rebecchi) asked the Confederation for the retirement of her iconic number 8 worn by her during 17 years with the national team. Nevertheless, the number is not officially retired by the CAH, although it has not been assigned to other players since.

Captains

Coaches

Gallery

See also

Argentina men's national field hockey team
Argentina women's national under-21 field hockey team

Notes
The team alternates between light blue and black skirt/socks when using their main kit, even during the same tournament, apparently arbitrarily. For example, during the 2010 World Cup, see photos from Day 1 (black), Day 3 (light blue) and Day 6 (black).

References

External links

FIH profile

 
 
Americas women's national field hockey teams